The 2001 United Kingdom general election in England was held on 7 June 2001 for 529 English seats to the House of Commons. The Labour Party won a landslide majority of English seats for the second election in a row.

Results table

Regional results

East Midlands

South East

South West

West Midlands

Yorkshire and the Humber

See also
 2001 United Kingdom general election in Northern Ireland
 2001 United Kingdom general election in Scotland
 2001 United Kingdom general election in Wales

References

England
2001 in England
General elections in England to the Parliament of the United Kingdom